Verticordia stenopetala is a flowering plant in the myrtle family, Myrtaceae and is endemic to the south-west of Western Australia. It is a low shrub with small leaves and heads of pink to magenta-coloured flowers in late spring and early summer.

Description
Verticordia stenopetala is a highly branched shrub which usually grows to a height  and wide.

Flowering time is from October to January.

Taxonomy and naming
Verticordia stenopetala was first formally described by Ludwig Diels in 1904 and the description was published in Botanische Jahrbücher für Systematik, Pflanzengeschichte und Pflanzengeographie. The specific epithet (stenopetala) is from the Ancient Greek words stenos meaning "narrow" and petalon meaning "petal".

In his review of the genus in 1991, Alex George placed this species in subgenus Verticordia, section Verticordia along with V. crebra, V. helichrysantha, V. plumosa, V. sieberi, V. harveyi, V. pityrhops, and V. fimbrilepis.

Distribution and habitat
This verticordia usually grows in sand, sometimes with gravel or loam in heath and mallee shrubland. It occurs between Walgoolan, Bullabulling and Forrestania in the Avon Wheatbelt, Coolgardie, and Mallee biogeographic regions.

Conservation
Verticordia stenopetala is classified as "Priority Three" by the Western Australian Government Department of Parks and Wildlife, meaning that it is poorly known and known from only a few locations but is not under imminent threat.

Use in horticulture
This verticordia had proven difficult to propagate and establish and few have been grown in gardens, even though it has been known for more than a century.

References

stenopetala
Rosids of Western Australia
Eudicots of Western Australia
Plants described in 1904